Overpeck (other names: Overpeck Station, Overpecks, Overpecks Station) is an unincorporated community in central St. Clair Township, Butler County, Ohio, United States.  It has a post office with the ZIP code 45055.  It lies between New Miami and Trenton.

Overpeck is a part of the Cincinnati-Middletown-Wilmington, OH-KY-IN Combined Statistical Area.

A post office called Overpecks Station was established in 1860, and the name was changed to Overpeck in 1882. The community has the name of Isaac Overpeck, an early resident.

Notable person
Charles Francis Richter, seismologist and eponym of Richter scale

References

Unincorporated communities in Ohio
Unincorporated communities in Butler County, Ohio
1860 establishments in Ohio